"Kid Dropper" Nathan Caplin or Kaplan (August 3, 1891 – August 28, 1923), also known as Jack the Dropper, was an American gangster who controlled labor racketeering and extortion in New York City during the post-World War I period into the early years of Prohibition in the early 1920s.

Biography
One of seven children, Kaplan was born in New York's Lower East Side on August 3, 1891. Kaplan began committing petty theft at an early age and later becoming a skilled sneak thief and pushcart extortionist, later becoming known for his skill with the "drop swindle". He was originally a member of the Paul Kelly's Five Points Gang. Around 1910, Kaplan had formed his own gang (associated with the Five Points Gang) briefly feuding with rival gang member Johnny Spanish until his arrest the following year for robbery for which he was sentenced to seven years in Sing Sing prison.

Upon his release in 1918, Kaplan became involved in "labor slugging", providing muscle to either side in the strikes common in New York in that era. Kaplan quickly filled the void left by "Dopey" Benny Fein and Joe "The Greaser" Rosenzweig in the aftermath of the internecine battles between those gangsters.  He organized former Five Points members, including Johnny Spanish. Another Jewish labor slugging gang led by Jacob "Little Augie" Orgen, rose steadily behind his.

Kaplan and Spanish, who had previously reconciled from an argument over a woman from their days in the Five Points Gang, soon began feuding again and eventually Spanish split from Kaplan's gang, forming his own separate gang. A violent war between the two soon began; fighting, particularly in the garment district, continued until Johnny Spanish was killed while leaving a Manhattan restaurant by three men, most likely including Kaplan, on July 29, 1919. Soon thereafter, Little Augie went to prison and his gang nearly dissolved, leaderless. After Spanish's death and Orgen's incarceration, Kaplan controlled all of labor slugging operations in New York. While Kaplan worked primarily for labor unions, he occasionally provided services for employers.

By the beginning of 1923, however, Kaplan began to face increasing competition from rivals. Jacob "Little Augie" Orgen had just been released from prison and had gathered back his gang.  Prominent among his gang were Jack "Legs" Diamond, Louis "Lepke" Buchalter, and Gurrah Shapiro. Kaplan and Orgen soon began fighting over protection of wet wash laundry workers in violent shootouts around New York. In one such altercation, Jacob Gurrah Shapiro was assaulted by Kaplan personally with his gun. Little Augie took this as an opportunity and had Shapiro go to the cops and press charges.

On August 28, 1923, Kaplan was arrested for carrying a concealed weapon and arraigned at Essex Market Court. News of the arrest attracted a large crowd of reporters and bystanders. As Kaplan was being transferred to another court, led by a police escort, he was shot and killed by Orgen gunman Louis Kerzner just after he entered a police car. Orgen gained control of Kaplan's operations until his own violent death in October 1927, possibly at the hands of Buchalter and Shapiro.

References

Further reading 
 Sifakis, Carl, The Encyclopedia of American Crime: Second Edition Vol. II (K–Z), Facts On File Inc., New York, 2001.
 Downey, Patrick. Gangster City: History of the New York Underworld, 1900–1935. Barricade Books, 2004.
 Goren, Arthur A., "Saints and Sinners: The underside of American Jewish History" The American Jewish Archives, 1988

External links

1891 births
1923 deaths
1923 murders in the United States
20th-century American criminals
Murdered Jewish American gangsters
Gang members of New York City
Prohibition-era gangsters
Five Points Gang
People murdered in New York City
Male murder victims
Deaths by firearm in Manhattan
20th-century American Jews